Huilong is a town of Xinfeng County in northern Guangdong province, China, situated  northwest of the county seat. , it has one residential community and 17 villages under its administration.

See also
List of township-level divisions of Guangdong

References

Township-level divisions of Guangdong